Miguel Bustamante (17 February 1939 – 13 November 2012) was an Ecuadorian footballer. He played in six matches for the Ecuador national football team from 1963 to 1967. He was also part of Ecuador's squad for the 1963 South American Championship.

References

1939 births
2012 deaths
Ecuadorian footballers
Ecuador international footballers
Association football defenders
Sportspeople from Guayaquil